Infrared is electromagnetic radiation with longer wavelengths than those of visible light, extending from the nominal red edge of the visible spectrum.

Infrared may also refer to:
Infrared spectroscopy, a subset of spectroscopy
Consumer infrared, as used in wireless remote controls, keyboards, and other devices
Infrared (record label), a UK-based record label
"Infra-Red" (Placebo song)
Infra-Red (Three Days Grace song)
"Infrared" (Pusha T song)
"Infrared" (Vybz Kartel & Masicka song)

See also
Infrared Data Association (IrDA)